Epiphanes is a genus of rotifers belonging to the family Epiphanidae.

The genus has an almost cosmopolitan distribution.

Species 
Epiphanes includes the following species:

 Epiphanes brachionus 
 Epiphanes chihuahuaensis 
 Epiphanes clavatula 
 Epiphanes clavulata 
 Epiphanes desmeti 
 Epiphanes hawaiensis 
 Epiphanes macroura 
 Epiphanes pelagica 
 Epiphanes senta 
 Epiphanes ukera

References

External links 
 
 

Rotifer genera
Ploima